The Chinese Ambassador to Mauritius is the official representative of the People's Republic of China to the Republic of Mauritius.

List of representatives

References 

 
China
Mauritius